Peters Park may refer to:
 Peters Park (Atlanta), a failed project to build one of Atlanta's first garden suburbs, now the site of the Georgia Tech campus
 Peters Park (Boston), a neighborhood in Boston